Yasser Khalil (born September 28, 1972) is an Egyptian journalist.

Biography

Since 1996, Yasser Khalil has covered political and cultural affairs in Egypt. He is the founder of the Kbret Network, the first bloggers' network in the Middle East.cit. req.

Khalil participated in the 2008 Forum 2000 conference in Prague as a delegate and panelist.cit. req.

He received The Encouragement Award from Kuwait for 'Outstanding Work and Research'.cit. req.

His work has appeared in the Christian Science Monitor (USA), Turkish Daily News (Turkey), Daily Star (Lebanon and Egypt), Arab News (Saidi Arabia), Alraya (Qatar), Anahar (Lebanon), Al-Ahrar (Egypt), Almadina (Saudi Arabia), Akhbar Al-Arab (UAE), Alewa Al-Islamy (Egypt), Almsar magazine (Sultan Qaboos University/ Oman), Alwasat (Bahrain), ABC News (USA), Alarabiya TV (Saudi Arabia), Yahoo News (USA), Common Ground news service (US), Gulf Research Center (UAE), and Middle East Online (UK).

References

I Protested for Freedom
In his death, Osama finds sympathy

External links

1972 births
Living people
Egyptian journalists